KNVO-FM (101.1 FM, "La Suavecita 101.1") is a radio station licensed to serve Port Isabel, Texas, United States. The station is owned by Entravision Communications. KNVO-FM broadcasts a Spanish adult hits music format to the Rio Grande Valley area. The Entravision studios are located in McAllen, with the transmitter near Rio Hondo.

History
After being approved in 1989, KVPA began broadcasting April 1, 1993, from studios on South Padre Island and airing a classic rock format. It was built by Charlie Trub, who had previously built up KRIO and KRIX. 

The station was sold to Sunburst Media and then, along with three other outlets, to Entravision in a $55 million acquisition in 2000. In 2003, KVPA's rhythmic contemporary hit radio format became KNVO-FM with a Spanish-language adult contemporary format under the brand .

The station was assigned the KNVO-FM call sign for the second time by the Federal Communications Commission on October 2, 2007.

References

External links

NVO-FM
NVO-FM
Radio stations established in 1993
Mass media in McAllen, Texas
1993 establishments in Texas
Entravision Communications stations
Regional Mexican radio stations in the United States
Adult hits radio stations in the United States